Daniel Fitzpatrick may refer to:

 D. J. Fitzpatrick (born 1982), American footballer
 Daniel R. Fitzpatrick (1891–1969), American editorial cartoonist